The NWA Texas Women's Championship is the National Wrestling Alliance's women's professional wrestling championship in the state of Texas.

Title history

See also
Jim Crockett Promotions
National Wrestling Alliance

Footnotes

References

External links
NWA Texas Women's Championship
NWA Texas Women's Title

National Wrestling Alliance championships
Women's professional wrestling championships
National Wrestling Alliance state wrestling championships
Professional wrestling in Texas